Cedarville is an unincorporated community in Dade County, in the U.S. state of Missouri.

History
Cedarville was laid out in 1869.  A post office called Cedarville was established in 1869, and remained in operation until 1909. The community takes its name from nearby Cedar Creek.

References

Unincorporated communities in Dade County, Missouri
Unincorporated communities in Missouri